Kingdom Hearts is a series of action role-playing games developed and published by Square Enix (formerly Square). It is the result of a collaboration between Square Enix and Disney Interactive Studios. Kingdom Hearts is a crossover of various Disney settings based in a universe made specifically for the series. The series features a mixture of familiar Disney, Final Fantasy, The World Ends with You and Pixar characters, as well as several new characters designed by Tetsuya Nomura. In addition, it has an all-star voice cast which includes many of the Disney characters' official voice actors.

The series centers on Sora's search for his friends and his encounters with various Disney and Final Fantasy characters along the way. Players primarily control Sora, though there are numerous characters that join Sora's party as computer controlled members. The majority of the characters were introduced in the original game Kingdom Hearts. Subsequent installments have featured several new original, Disney, and Final Fantasy characters, Dream Drop Distance introduces characters from Square Enix's The World Ends with You, while Kingdom Hearts III introduces characters from various Pixar franchises.

Various types of merchandise modeled after the characters' likeness have been produced, including figurines and jewelry. The characters have garnered praise from several video game websites and magazines for the quality of their voice acting and visual style. Comments have focused on the accurate presentation of Disney characters, the unique visual style of Square Enix characters, how well all the characters blend together, and the consistent quality performances from voice actors.

Creation and influences

The Kingdom Hearts series is directed by Tetsuya Nomura, the character designer of the games. Nomura has stated that unlike working with Final Fantasy characters, keeping the main character Sora alive and interesting over multiple games is a challenge. He also stated that though many of the Disney characters are not normally dark and serious, there were not many challenges making them so for the story, and despite this, their personalities shine because they maintain their own characteristics. Though Disney gave Nomura freedom in the characters and worlds used for the games, he and his staff tried to stay within the established roles of characters and boundaries of the worlds. When deciding which worlds to include in the game, the development staff tried to take into account worlds with Disney characters that would be interesting.

The inclusion of specific Final Fantasy characters was based on the opinions of fans and the development staff. Another criterion for inclusion was whether the staff felt the characters would fit into the storyline and in the Kingdom Hearts universe. Nomura was hesitant to use characters he did not design because he was unfamiliar with the background work of such characters. For Kingdom Hearts II, he changed his mind after receiving pressure from his staff. Throughout the development of the games, Nomura has often left certain events and connections between characters unexplained until the release of future games. Nomura did this because he feels that games should have room for fans to speculate and use their imagination. He stated that with speculation, even though a game may get old, people can still be happy with it.

Main original characters

Sora

Young Sora

 is the main protagonist of the Kingdom Hearts series, and the sole playable character of the original game. He is portrayed as a cheerful 14-year-old boy who lives on the Destiny Islands with his two childhood friends, Riku and Kairi. When his world is beset by creatures of darkness known as the Heartless, Sora comes into possession of a weapon of light called the Keyblade, and he embarks on a journey alongside Donald Duck and Goofy to protect other worlds from the Heartless and nobodies and other forces of evil.

Riku

Young Riku

 is a childhood friend and rival of Sora who resides with him and Kairi on the world of Destiny Islands. Originally appearing as a non-playable character in the original game, where he is introduced as a 15- year-old boy, he has a playable role in the "Reverse/Rebirth" story mode of Chain of Memories, the multiplayer mode of 358/2 Days, and the core story of Dream Drop Distance. He is also a computer-controlled party member exclusive to the final level of Kingdom Hearts II, and is temporarily playable during a sequence where Sora is incapacitated in the game's final boss battle. Riku is also briefly playable at several points in the "Dark World" in Kingdom Hearts III and is playable a few times in the Re Mind expansion of Kingdom Hearts III. His signature weapon is the "Soul Eater" sword, a manifestation of the darkness in his heart. During the first game, Riku is revealed to be the rightful owner of Sora's Keyblade, which is bequeathed onto the five-year-old Riku by Terra during the events of Birth by Sleep; however, his reliance on the power of darkness causes the Keyblade to reject Riku in favor of Sora. In Kingdom Hearts II, the 16-year-old Riku acquires another Keyblade of his own, the "Way to the Dawn"; this Keyblade is later broken in Kingdom Hearts III, leading him to obtain a new Keyblade, "Braveheart".

Kairi

Young Kairi

 is the main female protagonist of Kingdom Hearts. She is the best friend of Sora and Riku. Later, she is also in a romantic relationship with Sora. She is a non-playable character in most games of the series, but debuts as a playable character in the Re Mind scenario of Kingdom Hearts III. As one of the seven Princesses of Heart, she is cast adrift from her homeworld of Radiant Garden at a young age as part of Xehanort's experiment to locate the key bearer, which eventually brings her to the Destiny Islands, piquing Sora and Riku's interest in other worlds. In Birth by Sleep, it is revealed that her arrival on the islands is the result of an encounter with Aqua, who gives the four-year-old Kairi a protective charm to shield her from the darkness; Kairi gains the ability to wield a Keyblade after touching the one belonging to Aqua.

During Kingdom Hearts, the 14-year-old Kairi's heart is stolen by the darkness bugs commanded by "Ansem", sending her body into a coma while her heart takes refuge within Sora's. Upon learning her identity as a Princess of Heart and the location of her heart, Sora sacrifices his own heart in order to release hers and return to her body. While Sora disappears, Kairi escapes from a revived Ansem along with Donald Duck and Goofy. Soon after, Kairi finds Sora's Heartless and restores to human form. Kairi later remains behind on the restored Destiny Islands to await Sora's return from this journey. In Kingdom Hearts II, Kairi is approached by Axel to come with her, but she runs away with the help of Pluto and a dark corrider made by Riku. She is soon kidnapped by Saïx to motivate Sora towards acting in the Organization's wishes. She escapes with the help of Naminé and Riku, receiving her Keyblade "Destiny Embrace" from the latter to fight alongside Sora while the former merges with her to become a whole being once again. After Sora and Riku defeat the Organization's leader Xemnas, Kairi reunites with them at the Destiny Islands. In Dream Drop Distance, she is summoned by Yen Sid to train as a Keyblade wielder in order to combat Xehanort's reconfigured Organization XIII. In Kingdom Hearts III, Kairi trains with a reformed Axel in a secret place created by Merlin's magic. After completing her training, she reunites with her friends and shares with Sora a paopu, a legendary fruit that binds the destinies of those who eat it together. Afterwards, she participates in the final battle against Xehanort and Organization XIII, but Xehanort destroys her body to motivate Sora into helping recreate the χ-blade. Following Xehanort's defeat, Sora departs to restore Kairi by using the power of waking; in the final scene of the game, Kairi is shown to have been revived by Sora before he fades away as a consequence. In the "Limitcut" episode of Re Mind, Kairi is revealed to be in a deep sleep in Ansem's lab, as Ansem The Wise and his apprentices analyze her heart for clues on Sora's whereabouts. In Melody Of Memory, she awakens and is able to deduce with Riku that Sora is in a location outside of their own reality called "Quadratum". As Riku departs to save Sora, Kairi stays behind in order to train with Aqua to improve her skills.

Roxas

 is the initial player-controlled character of Kingdom Hearts II, featured during the game's prologue segment. Introduced as a youth living in a virtual simulation of Twilight Town, he discovers himself to be Sora's Nobody, born when Sora transformed into a Heartless to restore Kairi's heart during the events of the first game. He is also revealed to be a defector from Organization XIII, which sought to utilize his ability to wield the Keyblade. Roxas serves as the main protagonist of Kingdom Hearts 358/2 Days, which revolves around the circumstances leading to his eventual defection from the Organization. Roxas sacrifices his own existence to merge with Sora at the end of Kingdom Hearts II's prologue sequence, but is restored in a replica body during the events of Kingdom Hearts III.

Terra

 is one of the three playable characters of Birth by Sleep. He is a Keyblade wielder who is trained by Master Eraqus alongside Aqua and Ventus, developing a strong sibling-like bond and sharing his dream of becoming a Keyblade Master with them; gameplay-wise, he performs slower, heavier-hitting attacks than Aqua and Ventus. During an exam to obtain the Mark of Mastery, Master Xehanort manipulates the trials to stimulate the darkness that resides inside of Terra, for which he is denied the rank. He is thus easily manipulated by Xehanort's encouragements to channel his darkness into power, and becomes Xehanort's first vessel. Terra is ultimately freed from Xehanort's control and restored to normal during the events of Kingdom Hearts III.

Ventus

, commonly nicknamed , is one of the three playable characters of Birth by Sleep who is later revealed to be a member of the Dandelions who survived the Keyblade War before being displaced from his time to escape the destruction of Daybreak Town. Throughout the plot of Birth by Sleep, Xehanort intended Ventus to recreate χ-blade for his agenda. After Ventus sacrifices his heart to prevent the χ-blade's completion, his comatose body is sealed within Castle Oblivion while his heart takes refuge within Sora's, which factors into the physical appearance of Roxas. In Kingdom Hearts III, Sora becomes aware of Ventus's heart within him and uses the power of waking to send it back to his body, reviving him. Ventus later aids Sora and his allies in the final battle with Xehanort.

Aqua

 is a Keyblade Master who serves as one of the three playable characters of Birth by Sleep, and the sole playable character of A Fragmentary Passage, a direct sequel bundled in Kingdom Hearts HD 2.8 Final Chapter Prologue. She is also playable during one fight in Kingdom Hearts III. She is a nimble character who specializes in magic attacks while dealing weak physical damage. As the only one among her friends to achieve the rank of Keyblade Master by the start of the game, she is tasked by Master Eraqus to watch over Terra and retrieve Ventus when he runs away from home. While attempting to protect Ventus and save Terra from Xehanort's control, she becomes trapped in the realm of darkness, where she remains suspended in time throughout the series while fending off the endless swarms of Heartless. In Kingdom Hearts III, Sora rescues her from the realm of darkness, and she joins him in the final battle against Xehanort.

Recurring original characters

Xehanort

Master Xehanort

Terra-Xehanort/Ansem, Seeker of Darkness

Xemnas

Young Xehanort

 is the main antagonist of the Dark Seeker Saga, the first phase in the Kingdom Hearts series. Initially introduced as the original form of the sentient Heartless Ansem and Nobody Xemnas, Xehanort is further reestablished as an elderly Keyblade Master from the Destiny Islands who acquired the means to transplant his heart into the bodies of others, which he uses to orchestrate the events of the games up to Kingdom Hearts III to suit his agenda. Throughout the series, Xehanort is driven by an obsessive interest in the Keyblade War, a historic cataclysm that resulted in the universe's present, fragmented state. In Kingdom Hearts Birth by Sleep, he attempts to use the hearts of his pupils Ventus and Vanitas to forge the χ-blade and unlock Kingdom Hearts to incite another war, desiring to create a new world where light and darkness exist in perfect balance. He also transfers his heart into Terra's body, prolonging his own life. However, he is defeated through the combined efforts of Ventus, Terra and Aqua, sustaining amnesia in the process. In Kingdom Hearts 3D: Dream Drop Distance, Xehanort returns to his original form following the destruction of Ansem and Xemnas, who are revealed to have been created to reenact his original plan by gathering seven "guardians of light" and thirteen "seekers of darkness" in the form of the Princesses of Heart and Organization XIII, respectively; he also uses time travel to assemble Ansem, Xemnas, and other versions of himself from across time into a new Organization, sending their hearts into replica bodies to co-exist with their present self. In Kingdom Hearts III, where he is defeated and his past selves are eliminated during a showdown against Sora's group, Xehanort surrenders and allows his heart to pass on together with his former friend Eraqus. In Kingdom Hearts χ, he is revealed to be Ephemer's descendant.

Naminé

Introduced in Chain of Memories,  is revealed in Kingdom Hearts II to be Kairi's Nobody, created when Sora releases Kairi's heart from within himself during the events of the first game. She has the ability to change, rearrange, or erase the memories of Sora and those close to him, for which she is called a witch. Originating at Castle Oblivion, she is forced by Marluxia to alter Sora's memories so he remembers her as a close friend from the Destiny Islands, allowing Marluxia to manipulate him. She later defies Marluxia to reveal the truth to Sora, and oversees the year-long process to restore Sora and his friends' memories to their original state. Naminé also saves Riku in "Reverse/Rebirth" from Zexion, disguising herself as Kairi. In Kingdom Hearts II, Naminé visits Roxas in the virtual Twilight Town to help him discover his true identity as Sora's Nobody. Naminé returns in the game's final world to help Kairi escape from the Organization's dungeon, after which she merges with Kairi to complete her. In Kingdom Hearts III, Naminé plays a role in summoning the Lingering Will to help Sora against Terra-Xehanort after being temporarily separated from Kairi's heart. Later, when Kairi's body is destroyed by Xehanort, Naminé's heart is released and stored in a replica body provided to Ansem the Wise and his apprentices by Riku, restoring Naminé's existence as a separate person.

Organization XIII

 is a group created by Xehanort in his plan to acquire the χ-blade, introduced as thirteen Nobodies who seek the power of Kingdom Hearts to become complete humans, with Xehanort's Nobody Xemnas ranked first as their leader. With the exception of Xemnas using Ansem's name, each Organization member's name is an anagram of their original self's name with the letter "X" inserted. While Nobodies initially lack true emotion and morality at first, they gradually grow hearts over time. In Dream Drop Distance, it is revealed that the Organization's true purpose is to serve as vessels for Xehanort's heart in his plan to forge the χ-blade, with a second, "real" Organization XIII being assembled from several of the Organization's older members, who willingly return to their Nobody forms, and various incarnations of Xehanort brought from the past using artificial replica bodies. The first Organization's members also serve as computer-controlled party members of 358/2 Days, and are playable in the game's "Mission Mode". Excluding Xemnas and Roxas, the initial members and their original names are, in order of rank:

 Xigbar (Braig/Luxu), a marksman armed with two "arrowguns" (rayguns) and the power of spatial manipulation, introduced in Kingdom Hearts II. His role as one of Xehanort's first followers is further expanded in subsequent games, revealing him to be an incarnation of the ancient Keyblade wielder Luxu, who collaborates with Xehanort to observe his actions. Xigbar and Braig are voiced by Hōchū Ōtsuka in Japanese and James Patrick Stuart in English, while Luxu is voiced by Kenjiro Tsuda in Japanese and Max Mittelman in English.
 Xaldin (Dilan), an eloquent warrior who uses the power of wind to wield six lances at once, introduced in Kingdom Hearts II. Xaldin and Dilan are voiced by Yōsuke Akimoto in Japanese and David Dayan Fisher in English.
 Vexen (Even), a researcher and scientist who conducts various experiments for the Organization, introduced in Chain of Memories. He carries a shield and controls ice. While restored in Dream Drop Distance, Vexen returns to the Organization as one of Xehanort's "seekers of darkness" in Kingdom Hearts III to sabotage Xehanort's schemes and retrieve his research before his restored human self resumes his duties as Ansem's apprentice. In Japanese, the characters are voiced in most appearances by Nachi Nozawa, with Shigeru Chiba replacing him in Kingdom Hearts III; in English, Vexen and Even are voiced by Derek Stephen Prince.
 Lexaeus (Aeleus), a stalwart warrior who is the Organization's most physically powerful member, introduced in Chain of Memories. His weapon is an "axe sword", a long-bladed axe capable of shattering solid rock through his manipulation of earth. In most appearances, Lexaeus and Aeleus are voiced by Fumihiko Tachiki in Japanese and Dave Boat in English.
 Zexion (Ienzo), the youngest of the Organization's founders, who has the ability to create illusions. Initially appearing as a non-combatant in Chain of Memories, later games reveal his weapon to be a lexicon. In Dream Drop Distance and Kingdom Hearts III, his restored human self supports Sora's group by helping to reconstruct Roxas. Zexion and Ienzo are voiced by Akira Ishida in Japanese and Vince Corazza in English.
 Saïx (Isa), Xemnas' right-hand man and Axel's friend from Radiant Garden, introduced in Kingdom Hearts II. He draws power from the heart-shaped moon of Kingdom Hearts to assume a berserk state and transform his weapon, a claymore. He later appears in Dream Drop Distance as one of Xehanort's thirteen "seekers of darkness" from the original Organization, but secretly works against the Organization to help restore Roxas before reconciling with Lea in Kingdom Hearts III. He is voiced by Ginpei Sato in Japanese and Kirk Thornton in English.
 Axel (Lea), a Radiant Garden resident and the Organization's resident assassin, who controls fire to emblaze his chakram weapons. Introduced in Chain of Memories as a double agent under orders to dispatch the traitorous members at Castle Oblivion. Axel appears in Kingdom Hearts 358/2 Days as a mentor for Roxas. The two develop a friendship, and warns Roxas of the dangers of defecting the Organization. In Kingdom Hearts II, Axel helps Sora reach The World That Never Was as an apology for kidnapping Kairi, and sacrifies himself to allow Sora to escape. In Dream Drop Distance and Kingdom Hearts III, his restored human self becomes a Keyblade wielder and guardian of light. Axel and Lea are voiced by Keiji Fujiwara in Japanese and Quinton Flynn in English.
 Demyx, a laid-back member who controls water with his sitar music, introduced in Kingdom Hearts II. He appears in Kingdom Hearts III as a reserve "seeker of darkness" for his past as an ancient Keyblade wielder, but is convinced to help Vexen act against the Organization. Demyx is voiced by Kenichi Suzumura in Japanese and Ryan O'Donohue in English.
 Luxord, a courteous gambler who manipulates time and carries a deck of cards as his weapons, introduced in Kingdom Hearts II. He later appears in Kingdom Hearts III as one of Xehanort's seekers of darkness, recruited for his past as an ancient Keyblade wielder. Luxord is voiced by Jouji Nakata in Japanese and Robin Atkin Downes in English.
 Marluxia (Lauriam), a member who carries a scythe and deals out flower-based attacks. As the main antagonist of Chain of Memories, he presides over Castle Oblivion and harbors intentions of overthrowing the group using Sora and Naminé's powers. Despite his betrayal, he appears in Kingdom Hearts III as one of Xehanort's chosen "seekers of darkness" for his past as an ancient Keyblade wielder. In most appearances, he is voiced by Shūichi Ikeda in Japanese and Keith Ferguson in English.
 Larxene (Elrena), a female member and co-conspirator of Marluxia, introduced in Chain of Memories. She has electricity-based powers and carries a set of knives as her weapons. She appears in Kingdom Hearts III as one of Xehanort's chosen "seekers of darkness" for her past as an ancient Keyblade wielder. In most appearances, Larxene is voiced by Yūko Miyamura in Japanese and Shanelle Workman in English.
 Xion, the de facto fourteenth member of the Organization, introduced in 358/2 Days. Similar to Roxas, she wields a Keyblade and appears to lack memories of her past. While first appearing emotionless and static, she eventually befriends Roxas and Axel, and joins them on missions. Xion eventually discovers her true identity as an artificial human "replica" created from Sora's memories to duplicate Roxas' powers, which forces her to sacrifice her existence and all memories related to her in order to protect her friends. She is later revived as the final member of Xehanort's thirteen "seekers of darkness" before regaining her original memories and rejoining her friends. Xion is voiced by Risa Uchida in Japanese; in English, Xion is voiced by Alyson Stoner in 358/2 Days and Kingdom Hearts III, and by Hayden Panettiere in Birth by Sleep and Dream Drop Distance.

Riku Replica

 is a replica created by Vexen from the real Riku's combat data, first appearing as an antagonist in Chain of Memories. Initially appearing to be the real Riku under the influence of darkness, his true nature is revealed after he battles Sora to protect Naminé, who previously altered his memories so that he believed himself to be real as part of Marluxia's plan to manipulate Sora. The game's "Reverse/Rebirth" story mode depicts Riku's confrontations with his replica, who is eventually destroyed in a fight meant to prove his own right to exist after discovering his origins. In Kingdom Hearts III, Riku finds the replica's heart in the realm of darkness and gives it refuge within his own heart. A past version of the replica called "Dark Riku" also appears in the game as a member of the real Organization XIII, masquerading as the real Riku's younger self. After Dark Riku is defeated, Riku Replica sacrifices himself to extract Dark Riku's heart from its vessel, which he provides for Naminé.

Ansem the Wise

His true identity is uncovered in Kingdom Hearts II, simultaneously revealing the similarly named antagonist to be an impostor. Nine years prior to the first game's events, Ansem studies the darkness in people's hearts for the benefit of his world after taking an amnesic Terra-Xehanort in. After meeting with King Mickey and learning his research may be connected to a crisis happening in other worlds, Ansem ceases his experiments. However, Xehanort secretly continues the experiments under Ansem's name alongside Ansem's other pupils—Braig, Dilan, Even, Aeleus, and Ienzo—who exile Ansem to a world of nothingness and form Organization XIII. Ansem disguises himself as DiZ, an acronym for "Darkness in Zero", and escapes to exact revenge on the Organization.

In Chain of Memories, DiZ guides Riku through Castle Oblivion under the guise of Xehanort's Heartless. Together with Riku and Naminé, DiZ oversees the restoration of Sora, Donald, and Goofy's memories throughout 358/2 Days, moving them from Castle Oblivion to Twilight Town for safekeeping. When Roxas unwittingly begins absorbing Sora's memories, DiZ orders Riku to retrieve Roxas, whom he places inside a simulation of Twilight Town to eventually merge with Sora. In Kingdom Hearts II, DiZ's plans fall apart when Sora does not function as he wants upon awakening. Realizing the harm he has brought upon Sora and his friends, DiZ becomes remorseful and loses his lust for revenge. Ansem reveals himself to Mickey at the World That Never Was while attempting to digitally encode Xemnas' Kingdom Hearts within a machine. The hearts overload the machine and cause it to self-destruct, with Ansem allowing himself to be engulfed by the blast to atone for his mistakes.

In the epilogue of Birth by Sleep, Ansem is revealed to be alive in the realm of darkness, where he relays his intact memories of Sora to Aqua. In Dream Drop Distance, a digital copy of Ansem appears within Sora's heart to present Riku with research data he has hidden regarding Roxas, Xion, and Ventus's hearts. During the events of Kingdom Hearts III, Ansem is brought back to the realm of light by Xehanort's Heartless to locate one of his former test subjects for the Organization before being rescued by Vexen's intervention. Following Xehanort's defeat, Ansem resumes his role as ruler of Radiant Garden.

Vanitas

 is a Keyblade wielder and antagonist who first appears in Birth by Sleep, created by Master Xehanort from darkness extracted from Ventus's heart as part of the man's plan to forge the χ-blade. Vanitas was initially faceless at the time of his creation until Ventus connected his heart to the newborn Sora, considering Sora as a "brother" like Ventus since their connection defined him as a person. Though he aids Xehanort's scheme, Vanitas acted on his own whims to lure Ventus away from home in order to strengthen him into his equal to commence their reunion while attacking him and his friends with the Unversed manifesting from Vanitas's negative emotions. While Vanitas succeeded in merging back into Ventus during their final confrontation at the Keyblade Graveyard, their reunion produces an unstable χ-blade, which is destroyed along with Vanitas in a metaphysical battle against Ventus within their combined heart. However, after briefly appearing alongside Young Xehanort in Dream Drop Distance in reaction to the presence of Ventus's heart within Sora's. Vanitas is inducted into the real Organization XIII as one of the thirteen seekers of darkness in Kingdom Hearts III, using a replica body with the intention of reclaiming Ventus's heart. Vanitas returns to his original time upon being defeated a second time.

While developing Birth by Sleep, Nomura created Vanitas's relationship with Ventus under suggestion from the game's Osaka development team, as he enjoyed the idea of adding more connections between characters. He chose the name "Vanitas"—Latin for "emptiness"—for its similarity to Ventus's name, and because its Japanese translation, could be reinterpreted as Sora's name, which means "sky". A secret boss based on Vanitas called the  appears in Birth by Sleep.

Eraqus

Young Eraqus

 is introduced in Birth by Sleep as one of the few remaining Keyblade Masters alongside Xehanort, revealed to be descended from the Keyblade users that survived the Keyblade War. In charge of the Land of Departure, he is both a mentor and father figure to Terra, Aqua and Ventus, and is noted for being biased against the existence of darkness in favor of light, a key factor behind his eventual falling out with Xehanort. Nomura described his relationship with Xehanort as that of old friends and classmates. At the start of the game, Eraqus passes Aqua the Mark of Mastery but denies Terra, basing his decision on the darkness in Terra's heart. He sends Terra and Aqua to deal with the appearance of the Unversed and the disappearance of Master Xehanort, and also sends Aqua to retrieve Ventus, fearing that Xehanort will use Ventus to create the χ-blade. When Ventus confronts him over this and confirms his fears, Eraqus attempts to destroy Ventus to foil Xehanort's plan, but is stopped by Terra. After battling with his student, he is struck down by Xehanort and fades away, leaving his Keyblade behind. However, the game's secret ending reveals that Eraqus had hidden his own heart within Terra, allowing Terra to resist Xehanort's influence after being possessed by him. Eraqus returns in Kingdom Hearts III, emerging from Terra's restored body and persuading Xehanort to surrender, after which their hearts ascend to the afterlife. Dark Road explores Eraqus's childhood and his friendship with Xehanort, which will eventually lead to the events of Birth by Sleep.

Eraqus' name is an anagram of "Square", referencing series developer company Square Enix. He also bears a resemblance to Final Fantasy series creator Hironobu Sakaguchi.

Foretellers
The  are a group of Keyblade Masters trained under the Master of Masters, each a leader of one of the five Unions established to gather light and combat darkness. First appearing in Kingdom Hearts χ, the Foretellers are each given a copy of the Book of Prophecies, which details their master's prediction of the future and the manifestation of worlds. After the Master disappears, the Foretellers' paranoia of a traitor among themselves results in infighting that eventually leads to the Keyblade War and the destruction of the world. With the exception of Ava, the Foretellers appear in the epilogue of Kingdom Hearts III, where they are summoned by Luxu and informed of the events that occurred in their absence.

  is the "reliable" leader of the Unicornis Union, symbolized by a unicorn. Prior to disappearing, the Master of Masters assigns Ira to lead the other Foretellers in his place. Ira is voiced by Yūichirō Umehara in Japanese and Matthew Mercer in English.
  is the "virtuous" leader of the Anguis Union, symbolized by a snake. She acts as the Foretellers' moderator while also observing them and reporting her findings to Ira. She is voiced by Kana Hanazawa in Japanese and Karissa Lee Staples in English.
  is the "fearless" leader of the Ursus Union, symbolized by a bear. As Ira's second-in-command, Aced comes to doubt Ira's leadership and acts of his own accord to prevent the Keyblade War. He is voiced by Subaru Kimura in Japanese and Travis Willingham in English.
  is the "prudent" leader of the Vulpes Union, symbolized by a fox. Under her master's orders, she secretly recruits Keyblade wielders from various Unions to establish the Dandelions, a group who are sent to another world to ensure their survival after the prophesied Keyblade War. Sending the Dandelions off when the Keyblade War draws near, Ava ends up causing the event when she confronts Luxu over the truth behind the Lost Page. Ava is voiced by Yume Miyamoto in Japanese and Isabela Moner in English.
  is the "coolheaded" leader of the Leopardus Union, symbolized by a leopard. A lone wolf with little attachment to the other Foretellers, he is assigned the role of identifying the traitor among the group. He is voiced by Kaito Ishikawa in Japanese and Kevin Quinn in English.

Dandelions
The  are a group of Keyblade wielders recruited by Ava, each deemed strong enough to resist the darkness. They are sent to another world before the Keyblade War to prevent being caught in the battle and to help rebuild the world in its aftermath. In the new world, five of the Dandelions, including Ventus and Lauriam, are chosen to retain their memories of the Keyblade War and become the new Union leaders, forming the joint group Union Cross to ensure the event would never repeat itself. The other Dandelions, like Elrena, had their memories rewritten to forget the events leading to the Keyblade War. When the digital Daybreak Town is about to be destroyed, the Dandelions escape and are sent to the future, appearing in different times. 

  is a Keyblade wielder from a different Union than the player, his allegiance depending on the player's chosen Union. Being chosen as a Dandelion, Ephemer is sent away from the Keyblade War as one of Foretellers' successors. He becomes the leader of Union Cross and guides the group's decision-making. After the digital Daybreak Town is destroyed, he emerges in the real Daybreak Town's ruins and builds Scala Ad Caelum upon them. Dark Road reveals him to have been Xehanort's ancestor. He later appears in Kingdom Hearts III to help Sora in spirit. Ephemer is voiced by Yūto Uemura in Japanese and Michael Johnston in English.
  is a girl from the same Union as Ephemer, her first friend from the Union. She joins the player in investigating Ephemer's whereabouts following his disappearance, eventually becoming one of the leaders of Union Cross. After the digital Daybreak Town is destroyed, her whereabouts are left unknown.
  is one of the Keyblade wielders selected to serve as one of the leaders in Union Cross. Having obtained the Book of Prophecies from Ava as part of the Master of Masters' design, Brain believes the new world is destined to fall and begins working to change the future. His body is used as a vessel by Luxu following the Keyblade War. After the digital Daybreak Town is destroyed, he awakens in the future in Scala Ad Caelum, now no longer a vessel to Luxu.
  is one of the Keyblade wielders selected to serve as one of the new Union leaders, being both Lauriam's younger sister and a comrade of Elrena. Before she is able to convince the player to join the Dandelions, she is attacked by the Darkness-possessed Ventus, who takes her place and she fades from existence. Strelitzia is set to make a returning appearance in Kingdom Hearts IV.
  is the main character of χ and Union χ, whose name, gender, and appearance are chosen by the player. They are a Keyblade wielder from Daybreak Town who is chosen to join one of the Unions prior to the Keyblade War to compete for Lux. After sacrificing themselves to trap four True Darknesses within the data Daybreak Town and ensure the safety of their friends, they choose to join their heart with another person, and their new host eventually raises Xehanort before passing away.

Other characters
Virtual replicas of the three serve as Roxas' friends in DiZ's simulation of Twilight Town at the start of Kingdom Hearts II, while their real counterparts help Sora infiltrate Organization XIII's stronghold through the digital town. They also briefly encounter Roxas during 358/2 Days. In Kingdom Hearts II, the three are respectively voiced by Kazunori Sasaki, Hayato Taya, and Yuka Hirasawa in Japanese, and by Justin Cowden, Sean Marquette, and Jessica DiCicco in English. In Kingdom Hearts III, Sasaki and Hirasawa are replaced by Makoto Sutō and Yuna Watanabe in Japanese, while all three English actors are replaced by Zachary Gordon, Tristan Chase, and Ashley Boettcher.
  is a cat-like species of Dream Eater created by the Master of Masters, with each Keyblade wielder receiving one to aid in their endeavors. Due to an empathic link to their Keyblade wielders, a Chirithy transforms into a Nightmare if their user is tainted by darkness, with the appearance of one starting the chain of events leading to the Keyblade War. After the digital Daybreak Town is destroyed, the Chirithies merge with their Keyblade wielders' hearts to protect them, becoming new Dream Eaters. Ventus's Chirithy makes an appearance in Kingdom Hearts III, guiding Sora in the Final World before reuniting with Ventus. Chirithy is voiced by Tomoko Kaneda in Japanese and Lara Jill Miller in English.
 The  is the mentor to Luxu and the Foretellers who vanishes before the events of Kingdom Hearts χ. He possesses an eye with prophetic vision that allows him to transcribe the Book of Prophecies, embedding it within the "No Name" Keyblade and passing it down to maintain his future sight until it is acquired by Xehanort at the beginning of the series storyline. In Back Cover, he is shown to have a playful and mischievous personality that conceals his true nature. The Master of Masters is voiced by Tomokazu Sugita in Japanese and Ray Chase in English.
  is a character who appears in "Toy Box" world based on Toy Story as the lead of the in-series video game Verum Rex. He later appears physically in the secret ending of Kingdom Hearts III, and encounters Sora within the Final World in Kingdom Hearts III Re Mind as the boss of the expansion's Secret Episode. Yozora is voiced by Tasuku Hatanaka in Japanese and Dylan Sprouse in English. Nomura said in 2022 that he had had plans to create a Verum Rex game to develop Yozora, but the idea was scrapped in favor of Kingdom Hearts IV starring Sora as the lead as he was worried about his popularity.
 Master  is a senior Keyblade Master and mentor to Xehanort and Eraqus at Scala ad Caelum, appearing in Kingdom Hearts Dark Road. When seven upperclassmen disappear, he sends his new students to search the worlds. After most of his students are killed by Baldr, he decides to retire and make Eraqus his successor.
They are set on a mission to discover the whereabouts of their vanished colleagues. Vor, Urd, and Hermod are eventually killed by fellow wielder Baldr, while Bragi, who is secretly Luxu, fakes his death and escapes.
  is another Keyblade wielder who lives and trains in Scala ad Caelum, appearing in Dark Road. After his sister Hoder is killed protecting him, his grief and guilt cause him to be overtaken by darkness, and he kills several other students and nearly summons Kingdom Hearts before being defeated by Xehanort.
After Hoder, Heimdall, Helgi, and Sigrun are killed through the manipulations of an incarnation of True Darkness, the remaining three sought to summon Kingdom Hearts to avenge their deceased friends, not realizing that this is also part of the Darkness's plans. The last of the upperclassmen are killed by the Darkness-possessed Baldr during the final confrontation at Scala ad Caelum, but Hoder's ghost briefly returns to help Eraqus and Xehanort defeat Baldr.
  is the designation given to a mysterious girl mentioned by Ansem, Seeker of Darkness and Ansem the Wise in Kingdom Hearts III. Her whereabouts and true identity are currently unknown.
 The  is the spirit of a mysterious girl lingering within the Final World. While her identity is unknown, she appears to be a form of another character who has previously appeared in the series. She originally came from Quadratum, a world from "the other side". The Nameless Star is voiced by Risa Shimizu in Japanese and Madison Davenport in English.
  is a willfull embodiment of True Darkness, from which all other darkness spawns, and who exists in thirteen separate incarnations. In the aftermath of Union χ, seven are sealed within the Master of Masters and his six apprentices; four are trapped within the data Daybreak Town; one is sealed inside Ventus, later to be released as Vanitas; and one is unaccounted for.
  is an inhabitant of Scala ad Caelum whom Brain meets at the end of Kingdom Hearts Union χ.

Disney and Square Enix characters

Mickey Mouse

Mickey Mouse is depicted in the Kingdom Hearts series as the king of Disney Castle, frequently referred to in-game as "King Mickey" or simply . He is also an experienced Keyblade Master, alternatively wielding a golden version of Sora's "Kingdom Key" retrieved from the realm of darkness, and the "Star Seeker" he is seen using during his apprenticeship to Yen Sid in Birth by Sleep. Mickey is absent for most of the original game, which sees him departing his world to discover a solution to the Heartless' invasion, leaving instructions for Donald and Goofy telling to find and protect the Keyblade wielder. He has a more active role fighting alongside Sora and his allies in later installments, which first required the approval of Disney. He is a playable character in Kingdom Hearts II, stepping in to replace Sora whenever the player is defeated during certain boss battles until he is able to revive Sora. He is also available for play in the "Mission Mode" of Kingdom Hearts 358/2 Days as an unlockable character.

Donald Duck and Goofy

Donald Duck

Goofy

In various games, Donald Duck and Goofy serve as the player's main computer-controlled partners. They are both depicted as members of Disney Castle's royal court; Donald is a magician who is proficient with a variety of offensive and supportive spells, and Goofy is a peaceful knights' captain who performs supportive and defensive techniques with a shield. In Kingdom Hearts, Donald and Goofy embark on a journey to find their missing king, with orders from a letter left by Mickey to find the Keyblade wielder. They accompany Sora for this reason, initially viewing him as little more than a means to track down the king, and reluctantly abandoning him upon the discovery that Riku is the rightful owner of Sora's Keyblade. However, both eventually grow to care for Sora as a friend and remain with him. The two are also unlockable characters for play in 358/2 Days's "Mission Mode".

Maleficent

Maleficent, an evil fairy and the antagonist of the 1959 film Sleeping Beauty, appears as a secondary antagonist in the Kingdom Hearts series. During the first game, she leads a group of other Disney villains—Hades from Hercules, Jafar from Aladdin, Ursula from The Little Mermaid, Oogie Boogie from The Nightmare Before Christmas, and Captain Hook from Peter Pan—to capture the Princesses of Heart and harness the power of Kingdom Hearts, which she intends to use to conquer all worlds. In reality, she is an unwitting pawn of Xehanort, who first informs her of the princesses during the prequel Birth by Sleep as part of his own plan to gather components for the χ-blade. Her defeat results in her becoming trapped in the realm of darkness, but she returns after her raven forces Flora, Fauna, and Merryweather to recall their memories of her, allowing her to resume her conquest of worlds.<ref>{{cite video game|title=Kingdom Hearts II|developer=Square Enix|publisher=Square Enix U.S.A., Buena Vista Games|date=March 28, 2006|platform=PlayStation 2|quote=Merryweather: Haven't we seen this somewhere before? / Fauna: Yes, dear. I wonder whose it was... / Merryweather: Oh, Malefi— / Flora: No! We mustn't remember her name! Oh dear... / Merryweather:''' She was a mean ol' witch! Oh no! The memories are coming back! [...] Maleficent!}}</ref> Following Maleficent's attempts to acquire a new lair after losing Hollow Bastion, she and Pete proceed to search for the Master of Master's Black Box for much of Kingdom Hearts III before witnessing Luxu summoning the Foretellers.

Pete

Pete is included in Kingdom Hearts II as Maleficent's bumbling henchman who first encounters Sora's group while amassing a Heartless army for her, unaware of her earlier defeat. Originally a steamboat captain based on his depiction in Steamboat Willie, Pete is banished to another dimension by Queen Minnie for incessantly causing mischief around Disney Town under the masked superhero guises "Captain Justice" and "Captain Dark", as seen in Birth by Sleep. He becomes indebted to Maleficent when she frees him, and he vows to help conquer the worlds in return. He makes recurring appearances throughout Kingdom Hearts II and later installments, menacing Sora's group alongside Maleficent and various other Disney villains. A version of Pete based on his depiction in Mickey, Donald, Goofy: The Three Musketeers also appears in the "Country of the Musketeers" world based on the film.

Yen Sid

Yen Sid is the sorcerer from "The Sorcerer's Apprentice" segment of Fantasia, appearing as King Mickey's old mentor and a retired Keyblade Master who resides in the Mysterious Tower. He first appears in Kingdom Hearts II, where he informs Sora's group of their task at hand on Mickey's behalf. In addition to providing counsel to the main characters of Birth by Sleep, he proctors Sora and Riku's Mark of Mastery exam in Dream Drop Distance to prepare them for an inevitable showdown with Master Xehanort, training Kairi and Lea to serve as two of the potential seven "guardians of light" as well.

Princesses of Heart
The roster of the other Princesses includes five official Disney Princesses—Snow White from Snow White and the Seven Dwarfs, Cinderella from the Disney film of the same name, Aurora from Sleeping Beauty, Belle from Beauty and the Beast, and Jasmine from Aladdin, plus Alice from Alice in Wonderland. Kingdom Hearts III introduces new inheritors of the original maidens' powers called the —including Rapunzel from Tangled and the sisters Anna and Elsa from Frozen—with only Kairi retaining her original role.

Throughout the original game, Maleficent kidnaps the princesses for their ability to summon the Keyhole to Kingdom Hearts when brought together. Xehanort's Heartless "Ansem" later uses six of the princesses' hearts to forge a Keyblade with the power to unlock people's hearts, intending to free Kairi's heart from Sora's. Sora restores their hearts after using Ansem's Keyblade on himself to revive Kairi, destroying it. The other princesses remain at Hollow Bastion to contain the darkness spilling from the Keyhole until the door to Kingdom Hearts is sealed, subsequently returning to their homeworlds. In the prequel Birth by Sleep, it is revealed that Master Xehanort seeks out the Princesses of Heart, spurring Maleficent into gathering them as well; it is later explained in Dream Drop Distance that the princesses' hearts represent the seven fragments of light broken off from the χ-blade, which Xehanort intends to use in his plan to forge the weapon. To prevent this, Yen Sid prepares to substitute the princesses with seven Keyblade wielders to clash with Xehanort's reformed Organization XIII.

Party members and summons
Several games in the Kingdom Hearts series feature computer-controlled characters that are added to the player's party in a specific world. The first game features six different party members in addition to Donald and Goofy: Tarzan in the Deep Jungle; Aladdin in Agrabah; Ariel in Atlantica from The Little Mermaid; Jack Skellington in Halloween Town from The Nightmare Before Christmas; Peter Pan in Never Land; and Beast from Beauty and the Beast in Hollow Bastion, a world exclusive to the series. In addition, there are six characters that can be acquired as summoned allies in the game: adult Simba from The Lion King, Genie from Aladdin, Dumbo, Bambi, Tinker Bell from Peter Pan, and Mushu from Mulan. Chain of Memories features the same party and summoned characters from the first game, with the inclusion of Cloud Strife as an additional summon.

Aladdin, Jack, and the Beast return as party members in Kingdom Hearts II, with Ariel appearing in a non-playable capacity, and Peter Pan appearing as a summon in tandem with Tinker Bell. Adult Simba is featured as a full party member in The Lion Kings Pride Lands, while Mushu becomes a supporting ally in tandem with new party member Mulan in the film's Land of Dragons. Other new party members include Final Fantasy X character Auron in the Hercules-inspired Olympus Coliseum world, Jack Sparrow in the Pirates of the Caribbeans Port Royal, and Tron in Space Paranoids. Chicken Little and Stitch are included as new summons.Birth by Sleep removes the standard party system utilized by previous games, instead using characters as temporary partners during certain portions of the game. These characters are Prince Phillip in Enchanted Dominion, based on Sleeping Beauty; Hercules and Zack Fair in Olympus Coliseum, with the latter being based on his Final Fantasy VII: Crisis Core appearance; and Stitch, named "Experiment 626", in the Lilo & Stitch-inspired Deep Space.

Hercules and Jack Sparrow return as party members in Kingdom Hearts III, with new party members including Woody and Buzz Lightyear from Toy Story, Rapunzel and Flynn Rider from Tangled, James P. Sullivan and Mike Wazowski from Monsters, Inc., Marshmallow from Frozen, and Baymax from Big Hero 6, all in worlds based on their respective films. Wreck-It Ralph, Simba, Ariel, and Stitch also appear as summonable "Link" characters alongside the "Meow Wow" Dream Eater from Dream Drop Distance.

Guest Disney characters
One of the common elements in the Kingdom Hearts series is the inclusion of levels based on various Disney and Pixar films, as well as related media. Several key characters from the films appear in their respective worlds, closely following their roles from the film and play a small role in the main story.

Several characters from the Mickey Mouse and Donald Duck universes appear in the Kingdom Hearts series, most of them appearing at the original world Disney Castle and its adjacent urban area, Disney Town. Minnie Mouse is portrayed as the queen of Disney Castle who rules in the absence of her husband, King Mickey. Daisy Duck, Donald Duck's girlfriend, is Queen Minnie's lady-in-waiting. Pluto reprises his role as Mickey's pet and makes recurring appearances throughout the series, accompanying Donald and Goofy's search for the king in the first game. Chip 'n' Dale act as Disney Castle's technicians, managing the Gummi Ship that Sora's party uses to travel between worlds; they play a major role in Coded, where they construct the machine used to digitize the contents of Jiminy Cricket's journal. Donald's nephews Huey, Dewey, and Louie appear as shop owners in Kingdom Hearts and Kingdom Hearts II, where they attempt to save up money to go on their own adventure. Scrooge McDuck appears in Kingdom Hearts II, Birth by Sleep, and Kingdom Hearts III where he attempts to open business venues, such as a transit system between worlds, an ice cream business, and a restaurant in Twilight Town. The Beagle Boys, as depicted in Mickey, Donald, Goofy: The Three Musketeers, reprise their roles from the film as Pete's minions in the Dream Drop Distance level "Country of the Musketeers". Other characters such as Horace Horsecollar, Clarabelle Cow, and Clara Cluck make minor appearances in Kingdom Hearts II and Birth by Sleep. Ludwig Von Drake does not appear physically, but is mentioned on the Classic Kingdom posters found in Twilight Town in Kingdom Hearts III.

Characters from other Disney films also play prominent roles in the games' story. Jiminy Cricket appears as a chronicler of Sora's travels, recording information about the people, places and events they encounter in his journals; he also retains his role from Pinocchio as the title character's conscience. Merlin from The Sword in the Stone acts as Sora's mentor in performing magic, and he keeps an enchanted book that allows players access to the Hundred Acre Wood world based on Disney's Winnie the Pooh franchise. The Fairy Godmother from Cinderella appears in Merlin's house in Kingdom Hearts, where she transforms "summon gems" collected throughout the game into summoned allies; she also appears in Birth by Sleep as a resident of her original world, the Castle of Dreams. The One Hundred and One Dalmatians are featured in a side-quest in the first game, where players retrieve Pongo and Perdita's 99 puppies scattered throughout the game's worlds in exchange for prizes. Flora, Fauna, and Merryweather from Sleeping Beauty appear in Kingdom Hearts II, where they provide Sora with new clothes that grant him access to Drive Forms. Kingdom Hearts III includes Remy from Pixar's Ratatouille as the chef of Scrooge McDuck's bistro, where he hosts a cooking minigame.

Guest Square Enix characters
In addition to Disney elements, Kingdom Hearts features characters from other Square Enix-developed titles, most prominently Final Fantasy. A majority of the games include Moogles, small creatures that are a recurring element throughout the Final Fantasy series; they serve to run shops where players can create and purchase items used in the game.Kingdom Hearts prominently depicts several Final Fantasy characters as residents of the ruined world Radiant Garden, known as Hollow Bastion prior to Kingdom Hearts II. Led by Squall Leonheart from Final Fantasy VIII, who goes by the name  out of shame for his inability to save his home, the group also includes Final Fantasy VII characters Aerith Gainsborough, a flower girl and healer; Yuffie Kisaragi, a friendly ninja; and Cid Highwind, an expert in the games' "Gummi Ship" feature. These characters form the "Hollow Bastion Restoration Committee" in Kingdom Hearts II, with the goal of rebuilding their destroyed world following Maleficent's defeat, using the home of Merlin as a base. In both games, Leon and Yuffie are featured as opponents in the Olympus Coliseum. The Restoration Committee return in Kingdom Hearts III Re Mind, helping Riku search for clues to the missing Sora's disappearance.

Youthful versions of Final Fantasy X characters Tidus and Wakka, as well as Final Fantasy VIII character Selphie Tilmitt, make recurring appearances as residents of the Destiny Islands. The three serve as optional sparring partners early in the first game.

Cloud Strife appears in Kingdom Hearts at Olympus Coliseum, based on Disney's Hercules. In the game, he is a mercenary hired by Hades to kill Hercules in exchange for the whereabouts of Sephiroth, who is an optional boss included in the North American, PAL, and Final Mix releases of the game. Cloud and Tifa Lockhart later appear in Kingdom Hearts II as allies of the Hollow Bastion Restoration Committee; Sephiroth also returns here as an optional boss, and is depicted as the embodiment of Cloud's darkness.

Younger incarnations of Final Fantasy VIII characters Seifer Almasy, Fujin, and Raijin—the latter two named "Fuu" and "Rai", respectively—appear in Kingdom Hearts II as members of Twilight Town's self-proclaimed disciplinary committee. Twilight Town also depicts Final Fantasy IXs Vivi Ornitier as an admirer of Seifer, and Final Fantasy VIs Setzer Gabbiani as a champion of the local Struggle sport; neither character was designed by Nomura, who included them under pressure from his staff.

The Gullwings from Final Fantasy X-2—Yuna, Rikku and Paine—are depicted as fairy-like creatures in Kingdom Hearts II, where they are initially sent by Maleficent to spy on the Hollow Bastion Restoration Committee, but later switch sides to help Sora's group in exchange for treasure.

Kefka Palazzo and the Warring Triad from Final Fantasy VI appear as a Heartless boss named "Mysterious Sir" in Kingdom Hearts Union χ. The recurring Final Fantasy summoned beings Shiva, Ramuh, Ifrit and Leviathan also appear as Heartless bosses in the game.

The main characters of The World Ends with You—Neku Sakuraba, Yoshiya "Joshua" Kiryu, Shiki Misaki, Daisukenojo "Beat" Bito, and Raimu "Rhyme" Bito—appear in Dream Drop Distance as players of a Reapers' Game in Traverse Town. They are depicted as figments of their original selves, saved from fading out of existence by Joshua following Shibuya's destruction.

The SS-01 SchwarzGheist from Einhänder appears as a Gummi Heartless boss in Kingdom Hearts III under the name "SchwarzGheist".

Merchandise

The characters of the Kingdom Hearts series have had various types of merchandise modeled after their likeness. Square Enix has released a collection of Formation Arts figurines that feature several of the main characters from the first game. A series of Play Arts action figures has also been released. Other merchandise includes jewelry and key chains modeled after character apparel and accessories. The characters are also featured on posters, desktop wallpapers, and trading cards that are part of the Kingdom Hearts Trading Card Game.

Reception
Overall, the characters within the Kingdom Hearts series have been well received and have garnered praise for the quality of their voice acting as well as their visual style. IGN, GameSpy, and Game Informer all praised the animation quality of the characters. IGN's David Smith's impressions of the characters were very positive, referring to them as an "engaging cast", and stating the "characters' acting is helped immensely by the facial expressions and body". The design of the characters created specifically for Kingdom Hearts was seen as the highlight of the first game, stating "the majority of its best visual moments are based on original designs". One complaint he expressed was "the odd bit of cheating with the lip-synching, where textured facial features are substituted for full 3D animation". GameSpy stated the Disney characters "slide perfectly into Square's visual style", and complemented the realistic characters from Pirates of the Caribbean, describing them as "remarkably accurate".

GameSpot commented the first game created a "fascinating world" using the Disney and Final Fantasy characters. GameSpy stated the inclusion of the Disney and Square Enix characters was handled well. The main character Sora has also received press comments. In January 2007, Sora was listed the 4th biggest dork of 2006 by Game Informer, citing the Atlantica singing portions of the game. IGN listed him as a possible character in Super Smash Bros. Brawl; though he was not chosen as the "reader's choice".

GameSpy praised the voice cast and voice acting in the first and third games. G4TV awarded Kingdom Hearts II "Best Voice Over" in their 2006 G-phoria Awards. Game Informer praised the voice acting of the third game, particularly the performances by Haley Joel Osment, Christopher Lee, and James Woods. They also stated the voice talent "shines across the board." Reception towards the voice acting in Kingdom Hearts Birth by Sleep'', however, was decidedly mixed, with praise aimed at the performances of Jesse McCartney, Mark Hamill and Leonard Nimoy, while Willa Holland and Jason Dohring's performances received a more mixed reaction, with GameSpot referring to Dohring's performance as "abysmal".

References

External links

 Kingdom Hearts Japan official portal
 Kingdom Hearts North America official portal

 
Kingdom Hearts
Kingdom Hearts